Jonathan King (born 1944) is an English musician, music entrepreneur, and former TV and radio presenter.

Jonathan King may also refer to:

 Jonathan King (historian) (born 1942), Australian military historian
 Jonathan King (film director) (born 1967), film director from New Zealand
 Jonathan King (soccer) (born 1993), South African footballer

See also
 Jonathan Kings, Administrator of Tokelau in 2011–15
 John King (disambiguation)